Physodera is a genus of beetles in the family Carabidae, found mainly in Asia, containing the following species:

The following species have become synonyms:
 Physodera cupreomicans (Oberthur, 1883): Synonym of Diamella cupreomicans (Oberthur, 1883)

Description
Members of this genus usually have wide mandibles, exhibit forelegs with a well developed cleaning spur, and lack the primary mid-lateral setae on the pronotum.  The wing cases are short and broad.  The prothorax is nearly globular with a raised tergum.

Range

References

Lebiinae